Rosalind Mary Mitchison FRSE (11 April 1919 – 19 September 2002) was a 20th-century English historian and academic who specialised in Scottish social history. She was affectionately known as "Rowy" Mitchison.

Life

Rosalind Mary Wrong was born in Manchester. Her father, Edward Murray Wrong, and his father, George MacKinnon Wrong, were both historians. Her brother was Oliver Wrong.  

She was educated at Dragon School in Oxford then studied history at Lady Margaret Hall and went to the University of Manchester as an assistant lecturer, working under Sir Lewis Namier, in 1943. 

In 1953 her husband was appointed to a professorship at the University of Edinburgh and they moved to Scotland. Mitchison taught history, initially part-time, at Edinburgh until 1957. In 1962 she began teaching at the University of Glasgow where she remained until 1967, latterly as a full-time lecturer. Her first work, Agricultural Sir John (1962), broke new ground in the history of 18th-century Scotland, hitherto mainly studied, when studied at all, from the perspective of the Acts of Union 1707 or the Scottish Enlightenment.

She returned to the University of Edinburgh in 1967 as a Reader, and was by 1981 Emeritus Professor of Social History, a post she held until 1986.

In 1994 she was elected a Fellow of the Royal Society of Edinburgh. Her proposers were T. C. Smout, D Stevenson, T. M. Devine, Michael Francis Oliver, Charles Kemball and D. E. R. Watt.

She died in hospital in Edinburgh on 19 September 2002.

Family

In 1947, while Tutor at Lady Margaret Hall, she married zoologist John Murdoch Mitchison, son of Naomi Mitchison and Dick Mitchison. They had four children, three daughters and one son.

Books and publications
 Agricultural Sir John. The life of Sir John Sinclair of Ulster 1754–1835 Geoffrey Bles 1962  
 British population change since 1860 prepared for the Economic History Society Macmillan 1977 
 Coping with Destitution: Poverty and Relief in Western Europe (Joanne Goodman Lecture) University of Toronto Press 1992      
 Economy and society in Scotland and Ireland 1500–1939 edited by Rosalind Mitchison and Peter Roebuck   John Donald 1988    
 Essays in eighteenth-century history. From the English Historical Review / arranged by Rosalind Mitchison.  Longmans Green & Co.1966  
 Girls in trouble : sexuality and social control in rural Scotland, 1660–1780 with Leah Leneman.  Scottish Cultural Press 1998      
 History of Scotland Routledge 3rd revised edition 2002   
 Life in Scotland  Batsford 1978    
 Lordship to patronage : Scotland 1603–1745.  Edinburgh University Press 1990      
 Old Poor Law in Scotland : the experience of poverty, 1574–1845.  Edinburgh University Press 2000    
 People and society in Scotland. 1, 1760–1830 / edited by T.M. Devine and Rosalind Mitchison.  John Donald 1988/2006   
 Regional levels of Scottish illegitimacy, 1660–1770  1983   
 Roots of nationalism studies in northern Europe edited by Rosalind Mitchison  John Donald 1979/1980   
 Scotland in the age of improvement : essays in Scottish history in the eighteenth century edited by N.T. Phillipson and Rosalind Mitchison.  Edinburgh University Press New Edition 1997      
 Sin in the city : sexuality and social control in urban Scotland, 1160–1780 with Leah Leneman  Scottish Cultural Press 1998    
 Why Scottish history matters editor, Rosalind Mitchison  Saltire Society 1999

Sources

References

1919 births
2002 deaths
Academics of the University of Edinburgh
Academics of the University of Glasgow
Social historians
Alumni of Lady Margaret Hall, Oxford
Historians of Scotland
Academics from Greater Manchester
20th-century English historians